Cole Christiansen (born July 30, 1997) is an American football linebacker for the Kansas City Chiefs of the National Football League (NFL). He played college football at Army.

Early life and high school
Christiansen grew up on a horse farm in Suffolk, Virginia and attended Nansemond-Suffolk Academy, where he played football and lacrosse. He was named the Virginia Independent Schools Athletic Association Defensive Player of the Year and the Tidewater Conference Player of the Year as a junior and as a senior.

College career
Christiansen played for the Army Black Knights for four seasons. He became a starter in his sophomore season and finished second on the team with 84 tackles and was named a team captain going into his junior year. Christiansen finished second in tackles again as a junior with 77 while also leading the team with 12 tackles for loss. As a senior, he led the Black Knights with 112 tackles, with 3.5 tackles for loss, 2.5 sacks and two forced fumbles. Christiansen finished his collegiate career with 275 tackles.

Professional career

Los Angeles Chargers
Christiansen signed with the Los Angeles Chargers as an undrafted free agent on April 25, 2020, after receiving a waiver that allowed him to serve in the reserves and delay his active duty commitment until after his playing career is over. He was waived by the Chargers during final roster cuts on September 5, 2020, but was signed to the team's practice squad the next day. He was elevated to the active roster on November 21, November 28, and December 5 for the team's weeks 11, 12, and 13 games against the New York Jets, Buffalo Bills, and New England Patriots, and reverted to the practice squad after each game. He was promoted to the active roster on January 1, 2021.

On August 31, 2021, Christiansen was waived by the Chargers and re-signed to the practice squad the next day. He signed a reserve/future contract with the Chargers on January 11, 2022.

On August 30, 2022, Christiansen was waived by the Chargers.

Kansas City Chiefs
On September 1, 2022, Christiansen was signed to the Kansas City Chiefs practice squad. On October 15, 2022, he was elevated to the active roster. Two days later, he recorded his first tackle with the team against the Buffalo Bills. Christiansen became a Super Bowl champion when the Chiefs defeated the Philadelphia Eagles in Super Bowl LVII. He signed a reserve/future contract on February 15, 2023.

References

External links
Army Black Knights bio
Los Angeles Chargers bio
Personal Website

1997 births
Living people
Players of American football from Virginia
Sportspeople from Suffolk, Virginia
American football linebackers
Army Black Knights football players
Los Angeles Chargers players
Kansas City Chiefs players